Gerard Gumbau Garriga (born 18 December 1994) is a Spanish professional footballer who plays for Elche CF. Mainly a central midfielder, he can also play as a defensive midfielder or central defender.

Club career

Born in Campllong, Girona, Catalonia, Gumbau graduated from Girona FC's youth setup, and made his senior debuts with the reserves in the 2012–13 campaign, in Segona Catalana. He played a key part in the following season, in Primera Catalana, appearing in 31 matches and scoring six times, whilst being named on the bench with the first team in some occasions.

On 1 July 2014, Gumbau signed a three-year deal with FC Barcelona, being assigned to the B-team in Segunda División. On 23 August, he played his first match as a professional, replacing Wilfrid Kaptoum in the 76th minute of a 0–2 away loss against CA Osasuna. Gumbau scored his first professional goal on 7 September, netting his side's third in a 4–1 home routing over Real Zaragoza; three weeks later, he was sent off in a 3–3 draw at RCD Mallorca.

On 15 January 2015, Gumbau made his debut with the main squad, starting in a 4–0 Copa del Rey away win against Elche CF (9–0 on aggregate). He made his La Liga debut on 20 September 2015, coming on as a second-half substitute for Sergio Busquets in a 4–1 home routing of Levante UD. On 4 June 2017, he scored the winner for the B-side in a 2–1 away win against FC Cartagena, which proved to be decisive as his side advanced on the play-offs through the away goals rule.

On 12 July 2017, Gumbau signed a three-year contract with CD Leganés in the first division. He scored his first goal in the category the following 15 January, but in a 2–3 loss at Real Betis.

On 14 August 2019, Gumbau returned to his first club Girona, signing a three-year contract and being assigned to the main squad in the second level. He terminated his contract on 31 August 2021, and signed a two-year contract with Elche CF hours later.

Club statistics

Honours
Barcelona
La Liga: 2015–16
Copa del Rey: 2014–15, 2015–16
FIFA Club World Cup: 2015

References

External links

1994 births
Living people
People from Gironès
Sportspeople from the Province of Girona
Spanish footballers
Footballers from Catalonia
Association football midfielders
La Liga players
Segunda División players
Segunda División B players
Girona FC B players
FC Barcelona Atlètic players
FC Barcelona players
CD Leganés players
Girona FC players
Elche CF players
Catalonia international footballers